Rhön-Klinikum is a German cooperation of hospitals and clinics headquartered in Bad Neustadt an der Saale, Germany. It is a leading private hospital group in Germany.

Recent news
Founder Eugen Münch tried to sell Rhön-Klinikum to rival Fresenius in 2012 but German billionaire Bernard Broermann, fearing a dominant rival to his hospital chain Asklepios Kliniken, amassed a big enough stake in Rhön to block the deal. The firm still sold most of its hospitals to Fresenius in September 2013 for around $4.1 billion.

In 2020, Asklepios Kliniken, which already held 28.7% of Rhön’s shares at the time, announced plans to initially buy a 12.4% stake from Münch. The two would then pool Münch’s remaining stake of 7.6% in Rhön with shares held by Asklepios. As a result, their joint investment company would hold at least 49% in Rhön.

References

External links

Health care companies of Germany
Medical and health organisations based in Bavaria